is a Japanese video game developer and television and anime producer. He is best known for directing the live-action visual novel 428: Shibuya Scramble, producing the adventure video game Nine Hours, Nine Persons, Nine Doors, and creating the original concept for the anime short Under the Dog which was funded on Kickstarter.

Biography
Jiro Ishii started his career working on early PC games at Data East. He got a job at Chunsoft in 2000. In 2008, he directed 428: Shibuya Scramble, a live-action visual novel which earned a perfect score from Famitsu magazine, only the ninth game ever to do so. He moved to Level-5 to write and direct Time Travelers in 2012. Finally, he left to go freelance in 2015.

Works

Video games

Anime

Film and television
 - director
Another - production manager

References

External links
Profile on Qreators

Anime screenwriters
Japanese television directors
Japanese video game designers
Japanese video game directors
Japanese video game producers
Japanese writers
Living people
Video game writers
Year of birth missing (living people)